Kwee Kek Beng (1900–1975) was a Chinese Indonesian journalist and writer, best known for being editor-in-chief of the popular Malay language newspaper Sin Po from 1925 to 1947.

Biography

Early life
Kwee was born in Batavia, Dutch East Indies on November 16, 1900. In 1922 he started working as a schoolteacher in Bogor, not far from Batavia.

Journalism career
While still working as a teacher in 1922, Kwee contributed writings to the Dutch-language . Impressed by his writings, Na Tjin Hoe, an editor at  invited Kwee to work at the short-lived , a spinoff newspaper of  focusing on local news. Even this junior position at the newspaper gave him almost double the salary he had been making as a teacher. He soon transferred to the editorial board of  itself. When former editor-in-chief Tjoe Bou San died in 1925, Kwee Kek Beng was promoted to the position.

In 1929 he travelled outside of the Indies for the first time in his life, touring the Malay Peninsula and Singapore, following a few years later with his first trip to China in 1933. 
Like his predecessors, he was also a strong Chinese nationalist. But, as with many other Indies Chinese intellectuals during the late 1920s and early 1930s, he also became increasingly sympathetic to the rising Indonesian nationalist movement. He was a close personal friend of a number of nationalist leaders including Sukarno, Sartono, and WR Soepratman.

Shortly before the Japanese occupation of Indonesia, Kwee sent his relatives to hide out in Sukabumi. He himself planned to stay in Batavia under the assumed name Thio Boen Hiok, but soon found it too dangerous and fled to Bandung, where he spent most of the war.  Shortly after his departure his house in Batavia was discovered and looted by the Kenpeitai.

After the war ended  resumed publication and Kwee returned to his position. In 1947 he got into a dispute with publisher Ang Jan Goan, and resigned as editor-in-chief in 1947.

After Indonesian independence, he became a vocal critic of Indonesia's treatment of its Chinese minority. Nonetheless, in 1950 Kwee became an Indonesian citizen. He spent most of the 1950s as a freelance writer, publishing prolifically, especially about China. He founded a monthly journal Java Critic in 1948, contribute to the monthly Reporter during the 1950s and was editor of the annual journal  during 1956–60.

He died in Jakarta on May 31, 1975.

Family
His wife was named Tee Lim Nio. Their first son Kwee Hin Goan, born in 1932, became a well-known architect in Indonesia during the 1950s-1965 and in the Netherlands from 1966 to 1992. Their second son Kwee Hin Houw, born in 1938, became a journalist and lived in Germany from the 1960s until his death in 2016.

Selected writings
 (A brief overview of Chinese history) (in Dutch, Batavia, 1925)
 (in Dutch, Batavia, 1927); 
 (Twenty-five years as a journalist) (in Indonesian, Jakarta, 1948)
 (To a new China)(in Indonesian, Jakarta, 1952)
 (Around Stalin) (in Indonesian, Jakarta, 1953)
 (Who's who in New China) (in Indonesian, Jakarta, 1953)
 (Freed China) (1954)
 (in Indonesian, 1954)
 (in Indonesian, Jakarta, 1955)
 (50,000 kilometres in 100 days) (in Indonesian, Jakarta, 1965)

References

External links
Kwee Kek Beng holdings at WorldCat

1900 births
1975 deaths
Indonesian people of Chinese descent
Indonesian writers
20th-century journalists
Indonesian journalists
People from Batavia, Dutch East Indies
Indonesian newspaper editors
Newspaper editors from the Dutch East Indies
Journalists from the Dutch East Indies